Conyer's Green is a village in the civil parish of Great Barton, in the West Suffolk district, in the county of Suffolk, England.

Villages in Suffolk
Borough of St Edmundsbury